The 1962 Green Bay Packers season was their 44th season overall and their 42nd season in the National Football League. The team finished with a 13–1 record under coach Vince Lombardi, earning them a first-place finish in the Western Conference. The Packers ended the season by defeating the New York Giants 16–7 in the NFL Championship Game, the Packers second consecutive defeat of the Giants in the championship game. This marked the Packers' eighth NFL World Championship.

In 2007, ESPN.com ranked the 1962 Packers as the fifth-greatest defense in NFL history, noting, "The great 1962 Packers had a rock-solid defense front to back, with five Hall of Famers: defensive linemen Willie Davis and Henry Jordan, linebacker Ray Nitschke, cornerback Herb Adderley, and safety Willie Wood. (They also had 1962 All-Pro linebackers Dan Currie and Bill Forester.) Green Bay gave up just 10.8 points per game, shutting out opponents three times. The Packers held opposing QBs to a 43.5 rating, due, in part, to Wood's league-leading nine interceptions. The Packers' defense allowed the Giants 291 yards in the NFL championship game, but held the Giants offense scoreless as the Packers won, 16–7 (New York scored on a blocked punt)."

The Packers' +267 point differential (points scored vs. points against) in 1962 is the best total of any NFL team in the 1960s. Cold Hard Football Facts says that the 1962 Packers "may have been the best rushing team in the history of football. And that team etched in historic stone the image of Lombardi's three-yards-and-a-cloud-of-dust Packers that is still so powerful today."

The 1962 Packers ranked #9 on the 100 greatest teams of all time presented by the NFL on its 100th anniversary, the highest ranking of any Packers team. Other Green Bay teams coached by Vince Lombardi of the 100 greatest were in 1966 at #13 and 1967 at #56.

Offseason

NFL Draft 

 Yellow indicates a future Pro Bowl selection

Personnel

Staff

Roster

Preseason

Regular season 
The team was 7–0 at home and 6–1 on the road. It was the first time since 1944 that the club went undefeated at home.

Schedule 

Note: Intra-conference opponents are in bold text.

Season summary

Week 4 vs. Lions

Week 11 vs. Lions 

Thanksgiving Day game

Playoffs

Game summary

1962 NFL Championship Game at New York

Standings

Awards and records 
Led NFL, points scored, 415
Bart Starr, NFL leader, passing yards, (2,438 yards)
Jim Taylor, NFL rushing leader, (1,474 yards)
Willie Wood, NFL leader, interceptions (9)
Ray Nitschke, MVP of 1962 NFL Championship Game

References 

Sportsencyclopedia.com

Green Bay Packers seasons
National Football League championship seasons
Green Bay Packers
Green